Frederick John Monk (9 October 1920 – October 1987) was an English professional footballer and coach who played in Football League for Brentford and Aldershot. He is best remembered for his time with Brentford, for whom he made over 200 appearances and served as caretaker manager. He was posthumously inducted into the Brentford Hall of Fame in May 2015.

Club career

Guildford City 
After leaving school, Monk joined the reserve team at Southern League club Guildford City prior to the outbreak of the Second World War. After the war, Monk broke into the first team and scored 29 goals in the 1946–47 season. He scored another 17 goals in the 1947–48 season, before departing in March 1948.

Brentford 
Monk transferred to Second Division club Brentford in March 1948 and made his debut in a 2–0 victory over Tottenham Hotspur at Griffin Park on 20 March. He was Brentford's top-scorer during the 1948–49 season, with 13 goals. A centre forward by trade, Monk moved to right back during the 1949–50 season, but returned to his forward role in January 1951 and set a club record by scoring in 10 consecutive games between January and March 1951. Towards the end of the 1951–52 season, he again reverted to his right back role. Monk served as player-caretaker manager between the departure of Tommy Lawton and the appointment of Bill Dodgin Sr. early in the 1953–54 season. He left Brentford at the end of the season, after the club's relegation to the Third Division South was confirmed. He made 219 appearances and scored 49 goals for Brentford and was posthumously inducted into the club's Hall of Fame in May 2015.

Aldershot 
Monk transferred to Third Division South club Aldershot during the 1954 off-season and made 49 league appearances before retiring in 1956.

International career 
Monk was an England Schoolboy international.

Coaching career 
After his retirement from football, Monk returned to Brentford and worked as the first team's trainer between 1957 and 1962.

Honours 
 Brentford Hall of Fame

Career statistics

Player

Manager

References

1920 births
People from Brighton and Hove
English footballers
Association football fullbacks
Brentford F.C. players
English Football League players
Aldershot F.C. players
Guildford City F.C. players
1987 deaths
Brentford F.C. managers
English football managers